Parretti is a surname. Notable people with the surname include:

Giancarlo Parretti (born 1941), Italian financier
Tony Parretti (1892–1927), American gangster

See also
Parrett (surname)
Parrette